Sugihara (written: 杉原) is a Japanese family name and can refer to:

People
 Aiko Sugihara (born 1999), Japanese female artistic gymnast
 Anri Sugihara (born 1982), Japanese gravure idol
 Chiune Sugihara (1900–1986), Japanese diplomat, credited with saving the lives of some ten thousand Jews during the Holocaust
 George Sugihara (born 1949), professor of biological oceanography
 Kokichi Sugihara (born 1948), Japanese mathematician
 Teruo Sugihara (1937–2011), Japanese professional golfer
 Toshikazu Sugihara (born 1964), Japanese professional golfer
 Yasuhiro Sugihara or Sugizo (born 1969), Japanese musician, singer, songwriter, composer, and record producer

Other
 Sugihara Station
 25893 Sugihara

Fictional characters
 Sugihara in Go (2001 film)
 Sugihara in Jiraishin
 Makoto Sugihara in The Ancient Dogoo Girl

Japanese-language surnames